The tree of life vision is a vision discussed in the Book of Mormon, one of the scriptures of Latter Day Saint movement, published by Joseph Smith in 1830. In the Book of Mormon, the vision was received in a dream by the prophet Lehi, and later in vision by his son Nephi, who wrote about it in the First Book of Nephi. The vision includes a path leading to a tree symbolizing salvation, with an iron rod along the path whereby followers of Jesus may hold to the rod and avoid wandering off the path into pits or waters symbolizing the ways of sin. The vision also includes a large building wherein the wicked look down at the righteous and mock them.

The vision is said to symbolize the spiritual plight of humanity, and is a well known and cited story among members of the Church of Jesus Christ of Latter-day Saints (LDS Church). A Latter-day Saint commentator reflected a common belief of church members that the vision is "one of the richest, most flexible, and far-reaching pieces of symbolic prophecy contained in the standard works [scriptures]."

The vision is similar to the second vision recounted by Smith's father Joseph Smith Sr. prior to publication of the Book of Mormon. The vision of Smith Sr. contained a tree with delicious fruit, a path, and a large building where the wicked looked down in scorn of the righteous; however, the vision of Smith Sr. contained a rope rather than an iron rod, and there were other minor differences. Because of the similarity, secular church scholars postulate that Smith Sr.'s dream is the source for the tree of life vision. Smith Sr.'s dream was first recorded by his wife Lucy Mack Smith after publication of the Book of Mormon, and some Latter-day Saint scholars suggest that the text of the Book of Mormon may have influenced Lucy's account, rather than vice versa. Other apologetic scholars, such as Hugh Nibley, postulate that Lehi and Smith Sr. simply had the same archetypal vision.

Synopsis
According to the Book of Mormon, the prophet Lehi received this vision in a dream during his exile in the Arabian wilderness sometime after 600 B.C. He awoke and recounted it to his children as described in the 8th chapter of the First Book of Nephi. Lehi's son, Nephi, recorded the vision on the golden plates, and later had the  same vision, albeit a more detailed version, which he records later in the same book. Nephi's vision also included an interpretation of the vision.

In the vision, Lehi related that he saw several objects, including the following:
A tree with white fruit, symbolizing the love of God, and by extension, the atonement of Jesus.
A strait and narrow path, symbolizing the path to salvation.
A rod of iron, which runs along the path, symbolizing the "word of God". Holding onto the iron rod refers to holding tightly to the gospel of Jesus Christ, which enable a person to avoid the temptations of the world or to stray from the strait and narrow path.  
A mist of darkness, symbolizing the temptations of the devil.
A great and spacious building, symbolizing the pride of the world. The many inhabitants of the building mock and laugh at those who are on the strait and narrow path.

Lehi sees in the vision that his sons Sam and Nephi, and his wife Sariah partake of the white fruit, indicating that they will be saved. He sees that his sons Laman and Lemuel do not partake of the fruit.

Importance
The story of the vision is well known among members of the LDS Church and is widely cited. The "rod of iron" specifically is mentioned often referring to the scriptures or the words of the Lord, in order to convey the importance of heeding God's teachings.

Mesoamerican interpretations
LDS archaeologist M. Wells Jakeman wrote in 1958 that Izapa Stela 5, an ancient stela found in Mesoamerica in the 1930s, is a depiction of the tree of life vision. This interpretation is not supported by mainstream scholars. Mesoamerican researchers identify the central image as a Mesoamerican world tree, connecting the sky above and the water or underworld below. Mesoamerican art scholar Julia Guernsey Kappelman does not support this association between Izapa Stela 5 and the Book of Mormon. Kappelman has stated that Jakeman's research disregards the cultural context behind Izapa Stela 5 in favor of his own interpretations and biases.

In his book The Story of the Book of Mormon (published in 1888), LDS general authority George Reynolds interpreted folios 2-3 of Codex Boturini to be a representation of Lehi's dream. In this interpretation, of the group of five people closest to the tree, three are Sariah, Sam, and Nephi eating its fruit, and the other two are Laman and Lemuel refusing to eat. Further to the right, the death of Ishmael is depicted. In contrast, the mainstream scholarly interpretation is that the people and broken tree illustrated in these folios represent the split of the Mexica people from the Aztec people. The figure to the immediate right of the tree trunk is the Aztec god Huitzilopochtli.

See also 

 Archaeology and the Book of Mormon
 Tree of life
 Tree of life (biblical)
 Tree of the knowledge of good and evil

Notes

References 
  (2006) Ritual and Power in Stone: The Performance of Rulership in Mesoamerican Izapan Style Art, University of Texas Press, Austin, Texas, .
; Izapa (Precolumbian Art and Art History)", accessed December 2007.
 (1958) Stela 5, Izapa Chiapas, Mexico.
.

Further reading

External links
Book of Mormon video of the Tree of life vision produced by the LDS Church

Book of Mormon
Mormonism-related controversies
Trees in Christianity
Dream
Apparitions